Stepa is an American nu metal band from Thousand Oaks, California, that was active from 1998 to 2004, and again starting in 2022. The band was formed in 1998 as Phlip. Under that name, the band recorded a few demos. In 2001, Phlip renamed to Stepa and the group released one self-titled album through Locomotive Music on July 30, 2002.

The band toured with Locomotive labelmates Medication in 2002. In 2003, vocalist Blake Beckman and DJ Chaz Kindschi left the band. A three song demo called Teenage Funeral was released in 2003, containing songs that were supposed to appear on their scrapped second album. Teenage Funeral is the only release not to feature Blake Beckmann and Chaz Kindschi. The group disbanded in 2004 after the departure of guitarist Shane Swayney. Beckmann went on to front the alternative rock band Fermata and his solo project ...And the Fixation.

In August 2022, it was announced that the band had reunited and was working on their second album.

Debut album 
The band's currently sole album was a self titled release on Locomotive Music, which was released 30 July 2002. The album was produced by Scott Gaines, and Jay Baumgardner, with additional songwriting contributions from Mark Renk. Scott Borland, brother of Limp Bizkit guitarist Wes Borland, contributed additional keyboards to the album. The songs "Aquarium" and "Spaceships And Airplanes" were released as singles, despite plans of making music videos for both songs, only "Spaceships And Airplanes" got a music video.

Lineup 
 Blake Beckmann – Lead vocals
 Chaz Kindschi – Keyboards, programming; died 2022
 Jesse Krapff – bass
 Mark Thorley – drums
 Shane Swayney – Guitar and backing vocals
 Brendon Oates – Guitar

Discography 
 Stepa (2002, Locomotive Music)
 Teenage Funeral (2003, demo)

References

Musical groups from California
American nu metal musical groups
Musical groups established in 2001
Musical groups disestablished in 2004
Locomotive Music artists